Evolution is change in heritable traits of biological organisms over successive generations.

Evolution also may refer to:

Entertainment

Film and television
 Evolution (1971 film), Canadian animated short by Michael Mills
 Evolution (2001 film), American comic science fiction film by Ivan Reitman
 Evolution (2015 film), French horror-thriller film
 Evolution (2021 film), Hungarian drama film
 "Evolution" (Star Trek: The Next Generation), 1989 episode of Star Trek: The Next Generation
 "Evolution" (Stargate SG-1), pair of episodes of Stargate SG-1
 Evolution (TV series), 2002 documentary series
 ""Evolution" (The Walking Dead)", 2018 episode of The Walking Dead
 Pokémon Evolutions, a 2021 Japanese animated miniseries

Other uses

 Evolution (advertisement), 2006 promotion for Dove cosmetic soap
 Evolution (Guinness) or noitulovE, 2005–2006 Guinness advertising campaign
 Evolution (professional wrestling), professional wrestling stable in WWE
 WWE Evolution, WWE pay-per-view offering
 Evolution (AJPW), professional wrestling stable
 Evolution (ride), amusement-park ride
 Evolution (radio show)

Literature
 Evolution (Peel novel), 1994 Doctor Who novel by John Peel
 Evolution (journal), bimonthly scientific journal
 Evolution (Baxter novel), 2003 science fiction novel by Stephen Baxter
 Evolution: The Modern Synthesis, 1942 popular science book by Julian Huxley
 Evolution: The Story of Life, 2009 non-fiction book by Douglas Palmer

Music
 Evolution Festival, music festival held in Tyne and Wear from 2002 until 2013

Albums and EPs
 Evolution (Anastacia album) (2017)
 Evolution (Blood on the Dance Floor album) (2012)
 Evolution (Boyz II Men album) (1997)
 Evolution (Decoded Feedback album)
 Evolution (Dennis Coffey album)
 Evolution (Disturbed album) (2018)
 Evolution (Edge of Sanity album) (1999)
 Evolution (Ghost Town album) (2015)
 Evolution (Grachan Moncur III album) (1963)
 Evolution (Hed PE album)
 Evolution (Hollies album) (1967)
 Evolution (Infinite EP)
 Evolution (JLS album)
 Evolution (Journey album) (1979)
 Evolution (Joyner Lucas EP) (2020)
 Evolution (Magnum album) (2011)
 Evolution (Malo album) (1973)
 Evolution (Martina McBride album)
 Evolution (Masami Okui album) (2006)
 Evolution (Memorain album) (2012)
 Evolution (Nektar album) (2004)
 Evolution (Noiseworks album) (2022)
 Evolution (Oleta Adams album) (1993)
 Evolution (Once Human album) (2017)
 Evolution (Open Hand EP) (2000)
 Evolution (Paul van Dyk album) (2012)
 Evolution (Sabrina Carpenter album) (2016)
 Evolution (Scotch album) (1985)
 Evolution (Slum Village album) (2013)
 Evolution (Subhumans EP)
 Evolution (Teddy Charles album) (1955)
 Evolution (Tony MacAlpine album) (1995)
 Evolution (Twins album) (2003)
 Evolution (Viper album) (1992), or its title song
 Evolution: The Hits, compilation album by Dead or Alive
 Evolution, 1993 album by Geoff Moore and the Distance
 Evolution, 1994 album by Geoffrey Downes
 Evolution, 2012 album by Pamela Williams
Evolution, 2019 extended play by Excision and Wooli
Evolution, 2019 extended play by Jake Zyrus

Songs
 "Evolution" (Ayumi Hamasaki song) (2001)
 "Evolution" (Korn song) (2007)
 "Evolution", song by Cat Power from the album You Are Free (2003)
 "Evolution", song by State Radio from the album Let It Go (2009)
 "Evolution (The Grand Design)", song by Symphony X from their 2000 album V: The New Mythology Suite
 "Evolution", song by Roy Ayers from the album Mystic Voyage (1975)
 "Evolution" (Hardy), song by Edward W. Hardy (2016)

Games
 Evolution: The Origin of Species, 2010 card game published by Rightgames RBG
 Evolution, 2014 board game by North Star Games
 Evolution Championship Series, yearly fighting game tournament
 Evolution: The Game of Intelligent Life, 1997 strategy game edited by Discovery Channel
 Evolution: The World of Sacred Device, 1999 video game
 Evolution Studios, British video game developer
 Pokémon evolution, sudden change in form in the Pokémon universe
 CycloDS Evolution, Nintendo DS hardware for home brew games

Companies
 Evolution Aircraft, American aircraft manufacturer based in Redmond, Oregon 
 Evolution Group (UK), British financial services business
 Evolution Group (South Africa), South African financial services business
 Evolution Studios, British video game developer
 Evolutions Television, British television post-production company

Technology
 Beagle 2: Evolution, proposed successor to the Beagle 2 Mars lander
 DTA Evolution, French ultralight trike design
 Evolution (marketplace), black market operating on the Tor network
 Evolution (software), email client and calendar software
 Evolution engine, motorcycle engine from Harley-Davidson
 Mitsubishi Lancer Evolution, sports car
 MCV Evolution, single-deck bus
 EVolution, research project to reduce vehicle weight

See also
 Evilution (disambiguation)
 The Evolution (disambiguation)